Amitkumar Gautam (born 10 October 1995) is an Indian cricketer. He made his first-class debut for Rajasthan in the 2016–17 Ranji Trophy on 5 November 2016. He made his List A debut for Rajasthan in the 2017–18 Vijay Hazare Trophy on 5 February 2018.

References

External links
 

1995 births
Living people
Indian cricketers
Rajasthan cricketers
People from Dholpur district